Kafr Hud is a Syrian town located in the Mahardah Subdistrict of the Mahardah District in Hama Governorate. According to the Syria Central Bureau of Statistics (CBS), Kafr Hud had a population of 2,736 in the 2004 census. Its inhabitants are predominantly Sunni Muslims.

Etymology
The first word of Kafr Hud, which is Kafr, is a Syriac word for "farm" or "village". The second wordt 'Hud' is derived from another Syriac word, 'Hudtha' which refers to decoratation.

References

Bibliography

 

Populated places in Mahardah District